The 1984/85 FIS Nordic Combined World Cup was the second World Cup season, a combination of ski jumping and cross-country skiing organized by International Ski Federation. It started on 15 Dec 1984 in Planica, Yugoslavia and ended on 16 March 1985 in Oslo, Norway.

Calendar

Men

Standings

Overall

Nations Cup

References

External links 
FIS Nordic Combined World Cup 1984/85 

1984 in Nordic combined
1985 in Nordic combined
FIS Nordic Combined World Cup